Major-General Henry Frederick Lockyer, CB, KH (1797–30 August 1860) was an acting Governor of British Ceylon. He was appointed on 30 June 1860 and was acting Governor until 30 July 1860. On his return journey home, he died aboard the SS Ripon. He was succeeded by Charles Edmund Wilkinson.

References

Governors of British Ceylon
British expatriates in Sri Lanka
19th-century British people
General Officers Commanding, Ceylon
1797 births
1860 deaths
Companions of the Order of the Bath
British Army major generals
Queen's Own Royal West Kent Regiment officers
British Army personnel of the Crimean War